Mark Stephen Nabehet Loman (born June 24, 1995) is a Filipino mixed martial artist, currently competes in the Bantamweight division for the ONE Championship. He has previously fought in Brave Combat Federation, He is an inaugural and former Brave CF Bantamweight Champion. As of March 6, 2023, he is ranked #2 in the ONE Bantamweight rankings.

Mixed martial arts career

Brave Combat Federation
Loman his promotional debut against Frans Mlambo at Brave CF 1: The Beginning on September 23, 2016. He won the fight via unanimous decision.

Loman faced Gurdarshan Mangat for the inaugural Brave CF Bantamweight Championship at Brave CF 9: The Kingdom of Champions on November 17, 2017. He won the bout via TKO in the first round.

Loman made his first title defense rematch against Frans Mlambo at Brave CF 13: European Evolution on June 9, 2018. He won the fight via unanimous decision.

Loman defense title against Felipe Efrain at Brave CF 18 on November 16, 2018. Loman won the fight via unanimous decision.

Loman defense title against former Brave CF Featherweight Champion Elias Boudegzdame at Brave CF 22: Storm of Warriors on March 15, 2019. He won the fight via knockout in the fourth round.

Loman defense title against Louie Sanoudakis at BRAVE CF 30 on November 23, 2019. He won the fight via unanimous decision.

ONE Championship
On February 8, 2021, it was announced that Loman had signed with the ONE Championship.

Loman was scheduled to face John Lineker at ONE on TNT 4 on April 28, 2022. However, Loman would later withdraw from the card due to tested positive for COVID-19 and was replaced by Troy Worthen.

Loman made his debut against Yusup Saadulaev at ONE: Winter Warriors II on December 3, 2022 and aired December 17, 2022. He won the bout via technical knockout in the first round.

Loman faced Shoko Sato, replacing Yusup Saadulaev at ONE: X on March 26, 2022. He won the bout via unanimous decision.

Loman faced former two-time ONE Bantamweight World Champion Bibiano Fernandes on November 19, 2022, at ONE on Prime Video 4. At weigh-ins, the pair failed to make weight in the bantamweight division and agreed to compete in the 153.25 lbs catchweight. He won the fight via unanimous decision.

Championships and accomplishments
Brave Combat Federation
Brave CF Bantamweight Championship (One time; inaugural)
Four successful title defenses

Mixed martial arts record

|-
|Win
|align=center|17–2
|Bibiano Fernandes
|Decision (unanimous)
|ONE on Prime Video 4
|
|align=center|3
|align=center|5:00
|Kallang, Singapore
|
|-
| Win
| align=center| 16–2
| Shoko Sato 
| Decision (unanimous)
| ONE: X
| 
| align=center| 3
| align=center| 5:00
| Kallang, Singapore 
|
|-
| Win
| align=center| 15–2
| Yusup Saadulaev 
| TKO (punches)
| ONE: Winter Warriors II 
| 
| align=center| 1
| align=center| 4:09
| Kallang, Singapore
| 
|-
| Win
| align=center| 14–2
| Louie Sanoudakis
| Decision (unanimous)
| Brave CF 30 
| 
| align=center| 5
| align=center| 5:00
| Hyderabad, India
| 
|-
| Win
| align=center| 13–2
| Elias Boudegzdame
| KO (punches)
| Brave CF 22 
| 
| align=center| 4
| align=center| 4:59
| Pasay, Philippines 
| 
|-
| Win
| align=center| 12–2
| Felipe Efrain
| Decision (unanimous)
|  Brave CF 18
| 
| align=center| 5
| align=center| 5:00
| Manama, Bahrain
| 
|-
| Win
| align=center| 11–2
| Frans Mlambo
| Decision (unanimous)
| Brave CF 13: European Evolution 
| 
| align=center| 5
| align=center| 5:00
| Belfast, Northern Ireland 
| 
|-
| Win
| align=center| 10–2
| Gurdarshan Mangat
| TKO (punches)
| Brave CF 9: The Kingdom of Champions 
| 
| align=center| 1
| align=center| 2:49
| Isa Town, Bahrain 
| 
|-
| Win
| align=center| 9–2
| Mark Abelardo
| Decision (unanimous)
| PXC 55 
| 
| align=center| 3
| align=center| 5:00
| Mangilao, Guam
|
|-
| Win
| align=center| 8–2
| Frans Mlambo
| Decision (unanimous)
| Brave CF 1: The Beginning
| 
| align=center| 3
| align=center| 5:00
| Isa Town, Bahrain 
|
|-
| Win
| align=center| 7–2
| Ernie Braca
| Decision (unanimous)
| PXC 53
| 
| align=center| 3
| align=center| 5:00
| Parañaque, Philippines
|
|-
| Loss
| align=center| 6–2
| Rex De Lara
| KO (punch)
| PXC 51
| 
| align=center| 1
| align=center| 0:12
| Parañaque, Philippines
|
|-
| Win
| align=center| 6–1
| Dindo Camansa
| Submission (rear-naked choke)
| Breaking Barriers MMA Championship
| 
| align=center| 1
| align=center| N/A
| Baguio, Philippines 
|
|-
| Win
| align=center| 5–1
| Genil Francisco
| KO/TKO
| PXC Laban: Baguio 2
| 
| align=center| 1
| align=center| N/A
| Baguio, Philippines 
|
|-
| Win
| align=center| 4–1
| Richard Moraes
| Submission (rear-naked choke)
| Team Lakay Championship 9
| 
| align=center| 1
| align=center| N/A
| La Trinidad, Benguet, Philippines 
|
|-
| Loss
| align=center| 3–1
| Asker Baragunov
| TKO
| DARE 1/13: Rebels of MMA
| 
| align=center| 1
| align=center| N/A
| Bangkok, Thailand
|
|-
| Win
| align=center| 3–0
| Carlo Laurel
| Decision (unanimous)
| Team Lakay Championship 7
| 
| align=center| 3
| align=center| 5:00
| Baguio, Philippines
|
|-
| Win
| align=center| 2–0
| Alvin Velasco
| TKO (punches)
| URCC: Baguio 5
| 
| align=center| 1
| align=center| 1:32
| Baguio, Philippines
|
|-
| Win
| align=center| 1–0
| Raffy Lim
| TKO (punches)
| Team Lakay Championship 6 
| 
| align=center| 1
| align=center| 0:26
| La Trinidad, Benguet, Philippines 
|

See also
List of current ONE fighters

Notes

References

External links
 Stephen Loman at ONE

1992 births
Living people
Filipino male mixed martial artists
Filipino sanshou practitioners
Filipino Muay Thai practitioners
Mixed martial artists utilizing sanshou
Mixed martial artists utilizing Muay Thai
University of the Cordilleras alumni
Sportspeople from Baguio
Bantamweight mixed martial artists
Featherweight mixed martial artists